Wadzire is a village in Parner taluka in Ahmednagar district of state of Maharashtra, India.

Religion
The majority of the population in the village is Hindu. The Majority of the population belongs to a farming community from Maratha Caste.

Economy
-The majority of the population has farming as their primary occupation.

- Weeks of market Thursday.

Elections
2020
2015
2010
2005
2000

See also
 Parner taluka
 Villages in Parner taluka

References 

Villages in Parner taluka
Villages in Ahmednagar district